Choqa Qasem (also Romanized as Choqā Qāsem) is a village in Baladarband Rural District, in the Central District of Kermanshah County, Kermanshah Province, Iran. At the 2006 census, its population was 164, in 39 families.

References 

Populated places in Kermanshah County